Depressaria millefoliella is a moth of the family Depressariidae. It is found in France.

References

Moths described in 1908
Depressaria
Moths of Europe